Drumgelloch railway station was a railway station serving Drumgelloch, an eastern suburb of Airdrie, North Lanarkshire, Scotland.

History
The station was opened in 1989 by British Rail as the terminus of a short extension of the existing line from Airdrie, although the line to Bathgate Upper that passed through here had been closed to all traffic seven years earlier (passenger services having ceased in 1956).

The North Clyde Line has been extended eastwards beyond Drumgelloch towards , connecting with the Edinburgh–Bathgate line. Plans for the project (termed the Airdrie–Bathgate rail link) were approved by the Scottish Parliament in March 2007 and received Royal Assent in May 2007.

Work commenced in 2008. As part of this project, the 1989 single platform Drumgelloch station was closed on 9 May 2010. A substitute bus service was provided until a new station at a new site 550 metres further east was opened on 6 March 2011.

Services

From May 2010 
Following closure of the station as part of the Airdrie to Bathgate project, a half-hourly bus service operated to and from Airdrie station to connect with onward services to Glasgow and Helensburgh.

From December 2010 
Upon the opening of the 2010 station services operated from the new location, initially by bus due to delays in completion as a result of the inclement weather at the end of November 2010.

Gallery

References

Notes

Sources

External links

 Airdrie to Bathgate rail link website

Disused railway stations in North Lanarkshire
Railway stations opened by British Rail
1989 establishments in Scotland
Railway stations in Great Britain opened in 1989
Railway stations in Great Britain closed in 2010

nl:Station Drumgelloch